Black Cocktail is a fantasy novella by American author Jonathan Carroll.

Plot introduction
The novel follows the activities of Ingram York, a disc-jockey in Los Angeles. The book deals with the Platonic concept that everyone was originally joined to another human being and spends their lives searching for their missing half.

Awards and nominations
 World Fantasy, Best Novella, 1991 (nominated)

References
Amazon
Author Wars

1991 American novels
American fantasy novels
American novellas
Contemporary fantasy novels
Novels set in Los Angeles
Novels by Jonathan Carroll